There have been two baronetcies created for persons with the surname Bingham, one in the Baronetage of Nova Scotia and one in the Baronetage of the United Kingdom.

The Bingham Baronetcy, of Castlebar in the County of Mayo, was created in the Baronetage of Nova Scotia on 7 June 1634. For more information on this creation, see Earl of Lucan

The Bingham Baronetcy, of West Lea in the Parish of Ranmoor in the City of Sheffield, was created in the Baronetage of the United Kingdom on 12 December 1903 for John Bingham, a leading figure in the Sheffield cutlery industry and pioneer in the electroplating industry. The title became extinct on the death of the second Baronet in 1945.

Bingham baronets, of Castlebar (1634)
see Earl of Lucan

Bingham baronets, of West Lea (1903)
Sir John Edward Bingham, 1st Baronet (1839–1915)
Sir Albert Edward Bingham, 2nd Baronet (1868–1945)

References

Baronetcies in the Baronetage of Nova Scotia
Extinct baronetcies in the Baronetage of the United Kingdom
1634 establishments in Nova Scotia
1903 establishments in the United Kingdom